This is a list of what are intended to be the notable top hotels by country, five or four star hotels, notable skyscraper landmarks or historic hotels which are covered in multiple reliable publications. It should not be a directory of every hotel in every country:

Jamaica
 Bahia Principe
 The Enchanted Gardens
 Frenchman's Cove Resort
 Golden Clouds
 Goldeneye
 Goldeneye Hotel and Resort
 Hedonism Resorts
 Jamaica Pegasus Hotel
 Round Hill Hotel and Villas
 Strawberry Hill

Japan

 Awaji Yumebutai, Awaji, Hyōgo
 Fujiya Hotel, Hakone, Kanagawa
 Grand Prince Hotel Akasaka, Tokyo
 Grand Prince Hotel Takanawa, Tokyo
 Hoshi Ryokan, Komatsu
 Hotel New Grand, Yokohama
 Imperial Hotel, Tokyo
 Keio Plaza Hotel, Tokyo
 Kobe Meriken Park Oriental Hotel, Kobe
 Kōshien Hotel, Nishinomiya
 Mielparque
 Nakano Sun Plaza, Nakano
 Nara Hotel, Nara
 New Otani, Tokyo
 New Sanno Hotel, Tokyo
 Nikkō Kanaya Hotel, Nikko
 Oriental Hotel (Kobe, Japan), Kobe
 Palace Hotel, Tokyo, Tokyo
 The Peninsula Tokyo, Tokyo
 Sapporo Grand Hotel, Sapporo
 Sendai Sun Plaza, Sendai
 Toyoko Inn, Tokyo
 The Windsor Hotel Toya Resort & Spa, Tōyako
 Yokohama Landmark Tower, Yokohama

Jordan
Le Royal Hotel, Amman

References

J